The Reverend George W. White, D.D.  was the third president of the University of Southern California. He held office from 1895 to 1899. At the time of his appointment, he was presiding elder of the Los Angeles District of the Methodist Episcopal Conference.

References

External links
USC: Era of the Founders

Presidents of the University of Southern California
United Methodist Church
Methodist ministers
Year of death missing
Year of birth missing